Abroubagui Salbre is a Burkinabé professional footballer who plays as a winger for A.C. Belluno 1905 in Serie D.

Career
Born in Diapaga near Tapoa province in Burkina Faso, when he was child he moved to Italy and later he joined Portogruaro, being initially assigned to the reserve team in the campionato berretti.

On 8 January 2012 Salbre made his Lega Pro debut, coming on as a late substitute in a 1–4 away win against Pergocrema.

References

External links

Burkinabé footballers
1993 births
Living people
Serie D players
A.S.D. Portogruaro players
People from Est Region (Burkina Faso)
Association football wingers
21st-century Burkinabé people